

Events

Pre-1600
365 – The Alemanni cross the Rhine and invade Gaul. Emperor Valentinian I moves to Paris to command the army and defend the Gallic cities.
 996 – Emperor Otto III issues a deed to Gottschalk, Bishop of Freising, which is the oldest known document using the name Ostarrîchi (Austria in Old High German).
1009 – Berber forces led by Sulayman ibn al-Hakam defeat the Umayyad caliph Muhammad II of Córdoba in the battle of Alcolea.
1141 – Empress Matilda's reign as 'Lady of the English' ends with Stephen of Blois regaining the title of 'King of England'.
1179 – Philip II is crowned as 'King of France'.
1214 – The port city of Sinope surrenders to the Seljuq Turks.
1348 – The anti-royalist Union of Valencia attacks the Jews of Murviedro on the pretext that they are serfs of the King of Valencia and thus "royalists".
1503 – Pope Julius II is elected.
1512 – The ceiling of the Sistine Chapel, painted by Michelangelo, is exhibited to the public for the first time.
1520 – The Strait of Magellan, the passage immediately south of mainland South America connecting the Pacific and the Atlantic Oceans, is first discovered and navigated by European explorer Ferdinand Magellan during the first recorded circumnavigation voyage.
1555 – French Huguenots establish the France Antarctique colony in present-day Rio de Janeiro, Brazil.
1570 – The All Saints' Flood devastates the Dutch coast.

1601–1900
1604 – William Shakespeare's tragedy Othello is performed for the first time, at Whitehall Palace in London.
1611 – Shakespeare's play The Tempest is performed for the first time, at Whitehall Palace in London.
1612 – During the Time of Troubles, Polish troops are expelled from Moscow's Kitay-gorod by Russian troops under the command of Dmitry Pozharsky (22 October O.S.).
1683 – The British Crown colony of New York is subdivided into 12 counties.
1688 – William III of Orange sets out a second time from Hellevoetsluis in the Netherlands to seize the crowns of England, Scotland and Ireland from King James II of England during the Glorious Revolution.
1755 – In Portugal, Lisbon is totally devastated by a massive earthquake and tsunami, killing between 60,000 and 90,000 people.
1765 – The British Parliament enacts the Stamp Act on the Thirteen Colonies in order to help pay for British military operations in North America.
1790 – Edmund Burke publishes Reflections on the Revolution in France, in which he predicts that the French Revolution will end in a disaster.
1800 – John Adams becomes the first President of the United States to live in the Executive Mansion (later renamed the White House).
1805 – Napoleon Bonaparte invades Austria during the War of the Third Coalition.
1814 – Congress of Vienna opens to re-draw the European political map after the defeat of France in the Napoleonic Wars.
1848 – In Boston, Massachusetts, the first medical school for women, Boston Female Medical School (which later merged with the Boston University School of Medicine), opens.
1861 – American Civil War: U.S. President Abraham Lincoln appoints George B. McClellan as the commander of the Union Army, replacing General Winfield Scott.
1870 – In the United States, the Weather Bureau (later renamed the National Weather Service) makes its first official meteorological forecast.
1893 – The Battle of Bembezi took place and was the most decisive battle won by the British in the First Matabele War of 1893.
1894 – Nicholas II becomes the new (and last) Tsar of Russia after his father, Alexander III, dies.
  1894   – Buffalo Bill, 15 of his Native Americans, and Annie Oakley were filmed by Thomas Edison in his Black Maria Studio in West Orange, New Jersey.
1896 – A picture showing the bare breasts of a woman appears in National Geographic magazine for the first time.
1897 – The first Library of Congress building opens its doors to the public; the library had previously been housed in the Congressional Reading Room in the U.S. Capitol.
1897 – Italian Sport-Club Juventus is founded by a group of students of Liceo Classico Massimo d'Azeglio.

1901–present
1905 – Lahti, the city of Finland, is granted city rights by Tsar Nicholas II of Russia, the last Grand Duke of Finland.
1911 – World's first combat aerial bombing mission takes place in Libya during the Italo-Turkish War. Second Lieutenant Giulio Gavotti of Italy drops several small bombs.
  1914   – World War I: The Australian Imperial Force (AIF) departed by ship in a single convoy from Albany, Western Australia bound for Egypt.
1916 – In Russia, Pavel Milyukov delivers in the State Duma the famous "stupidity or treason" speech, precipitating the downfall of the government of Boris Stürmer.
1918 – World War I: With a brave action carried out into the waters of the Austro-Hungarian port of Pula, two officers of the Italian Regia Marina sink with a manned torpedo the enemy battleship SMS Viribus Unitis.
1918 – Malbone Street Wreck: The worst rapid transit accident in US history occurs under the intersection of Malbone Street and Flatbush Avenue, Brooklyn, New York City, with at least 102 deaths.
  1918   – Western Ukraine separates from Austria-Hungary.
1922 – Abolition of the Ottoman sultanate: The last sultan of the Ottoman Empire, Mehmed VI, abdicates.
1928 – The Law on the Adoption and Implementation of the Turkish Alphabet, replaces the Arabic alphabet with the Latin alphabet.
1937 – Stalinists execute Pastor Paul Hamberg and seven members of Azerbaijan's Lutheran community.
1938 – Seabiscuit defeats War Admiral in an upset victory during a match race deemed "the match of the century" in horse racing.
1941 – American photographer Ansel Adams takes a picture of a moonrise over the town of Hernandez, New Mexico that would become one of the most famous images in the history of photography.
1942 – World War II: Matanikau Offensive begins during the Guadalcanal Campaign and ends three days later with an American victory.
1943 – World War II: The 3rd Marine Division, United States Marines, landing on Bougainville in the Solomon Islands, secures a beachhead, leading that night to a naval clash at the Battle of Empress Augusta Bay.
1944 – World War II: Units of the British Army land at Walcheren.
1945 – The official North Korean newspaper, Rodong Sinmun, is first published under the name Chongro.
1948 – Athenagoras I, Ecumenical Patriarch of Constantinople, is enthroned.
1949 – All 55 people on board Eastern Air Lines Flight 537 are killed when the Douglas DC-4 operating the flight collides in mid-air with a Bolivian Air Force Lockheed P-38 Lightning aircraft over Alexandria, Virginia.
1950 – Puerto Rican nationalists Griselio Torresola and Oscar Collazo attempt to assassinate US President Harry S. Truman at Blair House.
1951 – Operation Buster–Jangle: Six thousand five hundred United States Army soldiers are exposed to 'Desert Rock' atomic explosions for training purposes in Nevada. Participation is not voluntary.
1952 – Nuclear weapons testing: The United States successfully detonates Ivy Mike, the first thermonuclear device, at the Eniwetok atoll. The explosion had a yield of ten megatons TNT equivalent.
1954 – The Front de Libération Nationale fires the first shots of the Algerian War of Independence.
1955 – The establishment of a Military Assistance Advisory Group in South Vietnam marks the beginning of American involvement in the conflict.
  1955   – The bombing of United Airlines Flight 629 occurs near Longmont, Colorado, killing all 39 passengers and five crew members aboard the Douglas DC-6B airliner.
1956 – The Indian states Kerala, Andhra Pradesh, and Mysore are formally created under the States Reorganisation Act; Kanyakumari district is joined to Tamil Nadu from Kerala.
  1956   – Hungarian Revolution: Imre Nagy announces Hungary's neutrality and withdrawal from the Warsaw Pact. Soviet troops begin to re-enter Hungary, contrary to assurances by the Soviet government. János Kádár and Ferenc Münnich secretly defect to the Soviets.
  1956   – The Springhill mining disaster in Springhill, Nova Scotia kills 39 miners; 88 are rescued.
1957 – The Mackinac Bridge, the world's longest suspension bridge between anchorages at the time, opens to traffic connecting Michigan's upper and lower peninsulas.
1963 – The Arecibo Observatory in Arecibo, Puerto Rico, with the largest radio telescope ever constructed, officially opens.
  1963   – The 1963 South Vietnamese coup begins.
1968 – The Motion Picture Association of America's film rating system is officially introduced, originating with the ratings G, M, R, and X.
1970 – Club Cinq-Sept fire in Saint-Laurent-du-Pont, France kills 146 young people.
1973 – Watergate scandal: Leon Jaworski is appointed as the new Watergate Special Prosecutor.
  1973   – The Indian state of Mysore is renamed as Karnataka to represent all the regions within Karunadu.
1979 – In Bolivia, Colonel Alberto Natusch executes a bloody coup d'état against the constitutional government of Wálter Guevara.
  1979   – Griselda Álvarez becomes the first female governor of a state of Mexico.
1981 – Antigua and Barbuda gains independence from the United Kingdom.
1982 – Honda becomes the first Asian automobile company to produce cars in the United States with the opening of its factory in Marysville, Ohio; a Honda Accord is the first car produced there.
1984 – After the assassination of Indira Gandhi, Prime Minister of India on 31 October 1984, by two of her Sikh bodyguards, anti-Sikh riots erupt.
1987 – British Rail Class 43 (HST) hits the record speed of 238 km/h for rail vehicles with on-board fuel to generate electricity for traction motors.
1991 – President of the Chechen Republic Dzhokhar Dudayev declares sovereignty of the Chechen Republic of Ichkeria from the Russian Federation.
1993 – The Maastricht Treaty takes effect, formally establishing the European Union.
2000 – Chhattisgarh officially becomes the 26th state of India, formed from sixteen districts of eastern Madhya Pradesh.
  2000   – Serbia and Montenegro joins the United Nations.
2001 – Turkey, Australia, and Canada agree to commit troops to the invasion of Afghanistan. 
2011 – Mario Draghi succeeds Jean-Claude Trichet and becomes the third president of the European Central Bank.
2012 – A fuel tank truck crashes and explodes in the Saudi Arabian capital Riyadh, killing 26 people and injuring 135.

Births

Pre-1600
 846 – Louis the Stammerer, Frankish king (d. 879)
1339 – Rudolf IV, Duke of Austria (d. 1365)
1351 – Leopold III, Duke of Austria (d. 1386)
1419 – Albert II, Duke of Brunswick-Grubenhagen (d. 1485)
1498 – Giovanni Ricci, Italian cardinal (d. 1574)
1499 – Rodrigo of Aragon, Italian noble (d. 1512)
1522 – Andrew Corbet, English landowner and politician (d. 1578)
1526 – Catherine Jagiellon, queen of John III of Sweden (d. 1583)
1527 – William Brooke, 10th Baron Cobham, English noble and politician (d. 1597)
1530 – Étienne de La Boétie, French philosopher and judge (d. 1563)
1539 – Pierre Pithou, French lawyer and scholar (d. 1596)
1550 – Henry of Saxe-Lauenburg, Prince-Archbishop of Bremen, Prince-Bishop of Osnabruck and Paderborn (d. 1585)
1567 – Diego Sarmiento de Acuña, 1st Count of Gondomar, Spanish academic and diplomat (d. 1626)
1585 – Jan Brożek, Polish mathematician, physician, and astronomer (d. 1652)
1596 – Pietro da Cortona, Italian painter (d. 1669)

1601–1900
1607 – Georg Philipp Harsdörffer, German poet and translator (d. 1658)
1609 – Matthew Hale, Lord Chief Justice of England (d. 1676)
1611 – François-Marie, comte de Broglie, Italian-French commander (d. 1656)
1625 – Oliver Plunkett, Irish archbishop and saint (d. 1681)
1636 – Nicolas Boileau-Despréaux, French poet and critic (d. 1711)
1643 – John Strype, English priest, historian, and author (d. 1737)
1661 – Florent Carton Dancourt, French actor and playwright (d. 1725)
  1661   – Louis, Grand Dauphin, heir apparent to the throne of France (d. 1711)
1666 – James Sherard, English botanist and curator (d. 1738)
1720 – Toussaint-Guillaume Picquet de la Motte, French admiral (d. 1791)
1727 – Ivan Shuvalov, Russian art collector and philanthropist (d. 1797)
1752 – Józef Zajączek, Polish general, politician (d. 1826)
1757 – Antonio Canova, Italian sculptor and educator (d. 1822)
1762 – Spencer Perceval, English lawyer and politician, Prime Minister of the United Kingdom (d. 1812)
1769 – Garlieb Merkel, German author and activist (d. 1850)
1778 – Gustav IV Adolf of Sweden (d. 1837)
1782 – F. J. Robinson, 1st Viscount Goderich, English politician, Prime Minister of the United Kingdom (d. 1859)
1808 – John Taylor, English-American religious leader, 3rd President of The Church of Jesus Christ of Latter-day Saints (d. 1887)
1831 – Harry Atkinson, English-New Zealand politician, 10th Prime Minister of New Zealand (d. 1892)
1838 – 11th Dalai Lama (d. 1856)
1839 – Ahmed Muhtar Pasha, Ottoman general and politician, 227th Grand Vizier of the Ottoman Empire (d. 1919)
1847 – Emma Albani, Canadian-English soprano and actress (d. 1930)
  1847   – Hiệp Hòa, Vietnamese emperor (d. 1883)
1848 – Caroline Still Anderson, American physician, educator and abolitionist (d. 1919)
  1848   – Jules Bastien-Lepage, French painter (d. 1884)
1849 – William Merritt Chase, American painter and educator (d. 1916)
1859 – Charles Brantley Aycock, American educator, lawyer, and politician, 50th Governor of North Carolina (d. 1912)
1862 – Johan Wagenaar, Dutch organist and composer (d. 1941)
1864 – Princess Elisabeth of Hesse and by Rhine (d. 1918)
1871 – Stephen Crane, American poet, novelist, and short story writer (d. 1900)
1872 – Louis Dewis, Belgian-French painter (d. 1946)
1877 – Roger Quilter, English composer (d. 1953)
1878 – Konrad Mägi, Estonian painter and educator (d. 1925)
  1878   – Carlos Saavedra Lamas, Argentinian academic and politician, Nobel Prize laureate (d. 1959)
1880 – Sholem Asch, Polish-American author and playwright (d. 1957)
  1880   – Grantland Rice, American journalist and poet (d. 1954)
  1880   – Alfred Wegener, German meteorologist and geophysicist (d. 1930)
1881 – Perikles Ioannidis, Greek admiral (d. 1965)
1886 – Hermann Broch, Austrian-American author and poet (d. 1951)
  1886   – Sakutarō Hagiwara, Japanese poet and critic (d. 1942)
1887 – L.S. Lowry, English painter and illustrator (d. 1976)
1888 – George Kenner, German-American painter and illustrator (d. 1971)
  1888   – Michał Sopoćko, Polish cleric and academic (d. 1975)
1889 – Hannah Höch, German painter and photographer (d. 1978) 
  1889   – Philip Noel-Baker, Baron Noel-Baker, English academic and politician, Secretary of State for Commonwealth Relations, Nobel Prize laureate (d. 1982)
1896 – Edmund Blunden, English author, poet, and critic (d. 1974)
1898 – Arthur Legat, Belgian race car driver (d. 1960)
  1898   – Sippie Wallace, American singer-songwriter and pianist (d. 1986)

1901–present
1902 – Nordahl Grieg, Norwegian journalist, author, poet, and playwright (d. 1943)
  1902   – Eugen Jochum, German conductor (d. 1987)
1903 – Max Adrian, Irish-born British actor (d. 1973)
  1903   – Edward Greeves, Jr., Australian footballer (d. 1963)
1904 – Laura LaPlante, American silent film actress (d. 1996)
1905 – Paul-Émile Borduas, Canadian-French painter and educator (d. 1960)
1906 – Johnny Indrisano, American boxer (d. 1968)
1907 – Maxie Rosenbloom, American boxer (d. 1976)
1909 – Hans Mork, South African-Australian rugby league player  (d. 1960)
1911 – Mingun Sayadaw, Burmese monk and scholar (d. 1993)
  1911   – Henri Troyat, French historian and author (d. 2007)
1912 – Gunther Plaut, German-Canadian rabbi and author (d. 2012)
1914 – Moshe Teitelbaum, Romanian-American rabbi (d. 2006)
1915 – Margaret Taylor-Burroughs, American painter, poet, and educator, co-founded the DuSable Museum of African American History (d. 2010)
1917 – Zenna Henderson, American author (d.1983)
  1917   – Clarence E. Miller, American engineer and politician (d. 2011)
1918 – Ken Miles, English-American race car driver (d. 1966)
1919 – Hermann Bondi, English-Austrian mathematician and cosmologist (d. 2005)
1920 – James J. Kilpatrick, American journalist and author (d. 2010)
  1920   – Ted Lowe, English sportscaster (d. 2011)
1921 – John W. Peterson, American pilot and songwriter (d. 2006)
  1921   – Harald Quandt, German businessman (d. 1967)
1922 – George S. Irving, American actor (d. 2016)
1923 – Victoria de los Ángeles, Spanish soprano and actress (d. 2005)
  1923   – Gordon R. Dickson, Canadian-American author (d. 2001)
  1923   – Menachem Elon, German-Israeli academic and jurist (d. 2013)
  1923   – Carlos Páez Vilaró, Uruguayan painter and sculptor (d. 2014)
1924 – Süleyman Demirel, Turkish engineer and politician, 9th President of Turkey (d. 2015)
  1924   – Jean-Luc Pépin, Canadian academic and politician, 19th Canadian Minister of Labour (d. 1995)
1926 – Stephen Antonakos, Greek-American sculptor (d. 2013)
  1926   – Betsy Palmer, American actress and game show panelist (d. 2015)
1927 – Vic Power, Puerto Rican-American baseball player and coach (d. 2005)
  1927   – Marcel Ophüls, German documentary filmmaker
1928 – James Bradford, American weightlifter (d. 2013)
1929 – Nicholas Mavroules, American lawyer and politician (d. 2003)
1930 – A. R. Gurney, American playwright and author (d. 2017)
  1930   – Russ Kemmerer, American baseball player and coach (d. 2014)
1931 – Yossef Gutfreund, Israeli wrestler and coach (d. 1972)
  1931   – Shunsuke Kikuchi, Japanese composer (d. 2021)
  1931   – Arne Pedersen, Norwegian footballer and manager (d. 2013)
1932 – Al Arbour, Canadian ice hockey player and coach (d. 2015)
  1932   – Francis Arinze, Nigerian cardinal
1933 – Antoine Kohn, Luxembourgian footballer and manager (d. 2012)
1934 – Umberto Agnelli, Swiss-Italian businessman and politician (d. 2004)
  1934   – Gillian Knight, English soprano and actress
  1934   – William Mathias, Welsh pianist and composer (d. 1992)
1935 – Gary Player, South African golfer and sportscaster
  1935   – Edward Said, Palestinian-American theorist, author, and academic (d. 2003)
1936 – Katsuhisa Hattori, Japanese composer and conductor (d. 2020)
  1936   – Shizuka Kamei, Japanese lawyer and politician
1937 – Bill Anderson, American country music singer-songwriter
1938 – Nicholasa Mohr, Puerto Rican American Nuyorican writer
  1940   – Roger Kellaway, American pianist and composer
1940 – Ramesh Chandra Lahoti, Indian lawyer and jurist, 35th Chief Justice of India
  1940   – Bruce Grocott, Baron Grocott, English academic and politician
  1940   – Barry Sadler, American sergeant, author, actor, and singer-songwriter (d. 1989)
1941 – Alfio Basile, Argentinian footballer and manager
  1941   – Robert Foxworth, American actor and director
  1941   – John Pullin, English rugby player
1942 – Larry Flynt, American publisher, founded Larry Flynt Publications (d. 2021)
  1942   – Ralph Klein, Canadian journalist and politician, 12th Premier of Alberta (d. 2013)
  1942   – Marcia Wallace, American actress and comedian (d. 2013)
1943 – Salvatore Adamo, Italian-Belgian singer-songwriter
  1943   – Jacques Attali, French economist and civil servant
1944 – Kinky Friedman, American singer-songwriter and author
  1944   – Bobby Heenan, American wrestler, manager, and sportscaster (d. 2017)
  1944   – Oscar Temaru, French-Polynesian soldier and politician, President of French Polynesia
  1944   – Rafic Hariri, Lebanese businessman and politician 60th Prime Minister of Lebanon (d. 2005)
1945 – Narendra Dabholkar, Indian author and activist, founded Maharashtra Andhashraddha Nirmoolan Samiti (d. 2013)
  1945   – John Williamson, Australian singer-songwriter
1946 – Ric Grech, British rock musician (d. 1990)
  1946   – Yuko Shimizu, Japanese graphic designer, created Hello Kitty
1947 – Ted Hendricks, Guatemalan-American football player
  1947   – Nick Owen, English journalist
  1947   – Jim Steinman, American songwriter and producer (d. 2021)
1948 – Phil Myre, Canadian ice hockey player and coach
  1948   – Amani Abeid Karume, Zanzibar accountant and politician, 6th President of Zanzibar
  1948   – Mike Mendoza, English radio host and politician
  1948   – Bill Woodrow, English sculptor and academic
1949 – David Foster, Canadian singer-songwriter, keyboard player, and producer 
  1949   – Michael D. Griffin, American physicist and engineer
  1949   – Belita Moreno, American actress and acting coach
1950 – Mitch Kapor, American computer programmer and businessman, founded Lotus Software and Electronic Frontier Foundation
  1950   – Robert B. Laughlin, American physicist and academic, Nobel Prize laureate
  1950   – Dan Peek, American singer-songwriter and musician (d. 2011)
1951 – Ronald Bell, American singer-songwriter, saxophonist, and producer (d. 2020)
  1951   – Fabrice Luchini, French actor and screenwriter
  1951   – Craig Serjeant, Australian cricketer and chemist
1953 – Jan Davis, American engineer and astronaut
  1953   – Paul Wellings, English ecologist and academic
1955 – Beth Leavel, American actress and singer
1957 – Lyle Lovett, American singer-songwriter, guitarist, and producer
  1957   – Murray Pierce, New Zealand rugby player
1958 – Mark Austin, English journalist
  1958   – Robert Hart, English singer-songwriter 
1959 – Susanna Clarke, English author and educator
1960 – Tim Cook, American businessman and engineer, current CEO of Apple Inc.
  1960   – Fernando Valenzuela, Mexican baseball player, coach, and sportscaster
1961 – Louise Boije af Gennäs, Swedish author and screenwriter
  1961   – Anne Donovan, American basketball player and coach (d. 2018)
  1961   – Calvin Johnson, American singer-songwriter, guitarist, and producer 
  1961   – Heng Swee Keat, Singaporean politician
1962 – Sharron Davies, English swimmer
  1962   – Magne Furuholmen, Norwegian singer-songwriter and guitarist 
  1962   – Anthony Kiedis, American singer-songwriter 
1963 – Nita Ambani, Indian businesswoman
  1963   – Mark Hughes, Welsh footballer and manager
  1963   – Big Kenny, American singer-songwriter and guitarist 
1964 – Sophie B. Hawkins, American singer-songwriter and guitarist
1965 – Michael Daley, Australian politician
  1965   – Patrik Ringborg, Swedish conductor
1966 – Willie D, American rapper and entrepreneur 
  1966   – Mary Hansen, Australian singer and musician (d. 2002)
  1966   – Gary Howell, American businessman and politician
  1966   – Jeremy Hunt, English businessman and politician, Secretary of State for Health
  1966   – Ashab Uddin, Indian-Bengali politician 
1967 – Tina Arena, Australian singer-songwriter, producer, and actress 
  1967   – Carla van de Puttelaar, Dutch photographer
1969 – Gary Alexander, American basketball player
  1969   – Tie Domi, Canadian ice hockey player and sportscaster
1970 – Sherwin Campbell, Barbadian cricketer
  1970   – Toma Enache, Romanian film director
1972 – Toni Collette, Australian actress
  1972   – Paul Dickov, Scottish footballer and manager
  1972   – Jenny McCarthy, American actress and model
1973 – Geoff Horsfield, English footballer and manager
  1973   – Aishwarya Rai Bachchan, Indian model and actress
1974 – V. V. S. Laxman, Indian cricketer
1975 – Bo Bice, American singer and musician
  1975   – Keryn Jordan, South African footballer (d. 2013)
  1975   – Megan Wing, Canadian figure skater and coach
1976 – Sergei Artyukhin, Russian-Belarusian wrestler (d. 2012)
 1976 – Bryan Harsin, American college football coach
1978 – Danny Koevermans, Dutch footballer and manager
  1978   – Helen Czerski, English physicist and oceanographer
1979 – Milan Dudić, Serbian footballer
  1979   – Alex Prager, American photographer and director
1980 – Bilgin Defterli, Turkish footballer
1982 – Bradley Orr, English footballer
  1982   – Warren Spragg, English-Italian rugby player
1983 – Matt Moulson, Canadian ice hockey player
  1983   – Yuko Ogura, Japanese model and singer
  1983   – Jon Wilkin, English rugby player
1984 – Miloš Krasić, Serbian footballer
1986 – Penn Badgley, American actor and television personality
  1986   – Ksenija Balta, Estonian high jumper, sprinter, and heptathlete
1987 – Ileana D'Cruz, Indian film actress
1988 – Masahiro Tanaka, Japanese baseball player
1991 – Reece Brown, English footballer
  1991   – Jiang Yuyuan, Chinese gymnast
1994 – James Ward-Prowse, English footballer
1995 – Margarita Mamun, Russian gymnast
1996 – Yoo Jeongyeon, South Korean singer

Deaths

Pre-1600
 934 – Beornstan of Winchester, English bishop
 970 – Boso of Merseburg, German bishop
1038 – Herman I, Margrave of Meissen (b. c. 980)
1296 – Guillaume Durand, French bishop and theologian (b. 1230)
1319 – Uguccione della Faggiuola, Italian condottieri (b. c. 1250)
1324 – John de Halton, Bishop of Carlisle
1391 – Amadeus VII, Count of Savoy (b. 1360)
1399 – John IV, Duke of Brittany (b. 1339)
1406 – Joanna, Duchess of Brabant (b. 1322)
1423 – Nicholas Eudaimonoioannes, Byzantine diplomat (probable date)
1461 – David of Trebizond (b. 1408)
1496 – Filippo Buonaccorsi (Filip Callimachus), Italian humanist writer (b. 1437)
1546 – Giulio Romano, Italian painter and architect (b. 1499)
1588 – Jean Daurat, French poet and scholar (b. 1508)
1596 – Pierre Pithou, French lawyer and scholar (b. 1539)

1601–1900
1629 – Hendrick ter Brugghen, Dutch painter (b. 1588)
1642 – Jean Nicolet, French-Canadian explorer (b. 1598)
1676 – Gisbertus Voetius, Dutch minister and theologian (b. 1589)
1678 – William Coddington, American judge and politician, 1st Governor of Rhode Island (b. 1601)
1700 – Charles II of Spain (b. 1661)
1814 – Alexander Samoylov, Russian general and politician, Russian Minister of Justice (b. 1744)
1888 – Nikolay Przhevalsky, Russian geographer and explorer (b. 1838)
1894 – Alexander III of Russia (b. 1845)

1901–present
1903 – Theodor Mommsen, German archaeologist, journalist, and politician, Nobel Prize laureate (b. 1817)
1907 – Alfred Jarry, French author and playwright (b. 1873) 
1925 – Max Linder, French actor, director, screenwriter, producer and comedian (b. 1883)
1938 – Charles Weeghman, American businessman (b. 1874)
1942 – Hugo Distler, German organist, composer, and conductor (b. 1908)
1952 – Dixie Lee, American singer (b. 1911)
1955 – Dale Carnegie, American author and educator (b. 1888)
1958 – Yahya Kemal Beyatlı, Turkish poet, author, and diplomat (b. 1884)
1962 – Ricardo Rodríguez, Mexican race car driver (b. 1942)
1968 – Georgios Papandreou, Greek economist and politician, 134th Prime Minister of Greece (b. 1888)
1970 – Robert Staughton Lynd, American sociologist and academic (b. 1892)
1972 – Waldemar Hammenhög, Swedish author (b. 1902)
  1972   – Robert MacArthur, Canadian-American ecologist and academic (b. 1930)
  1972   – Ezra Pound, American poet and critic (b. 1885)
1982 – James Broderick, American actor and director (b. 1927)
  1982   – King Vidor, American director, producer, and screenwriter (b. 1894)
1983 – Anthony van Hoboken, Dutch-Swiss musicologist and author (b. 1887)
1984 – Norman Krasna, American director, producer, and screenwriter (b. 1909)
1985 – Arnold Pihlak, Estonian-English footballer (b. 1902)
  1985   – Phil Silvers, American actor and comedian (b. 1911)
1986 – Serge Garant, Canadian composer and conductor (b. 1929)
1987 – René Lévesque, Canadian journalist and politician, 23rd Premier of Quebec (b. 1922)
1993 – Severo Ochoa, Spanish-American biochemist and academic, Nobel Prize laureate (b. 1905)
  1993   – A. N. Sherwin-White, English historian and scholar (b. 1911)
1994 – Noah Beery, Jr., American actor (b. 1913)
1996 – J. R. Jayewardene, Sri Lankan lawyer and politician, 2nd President of Sri Lanka (b. 1906)
1999 – Theodore Hall, American physicist and spy (b. 1925)
  1999   – Walter Payton, American football player and race car driver (b. 1954)
2000 – George Armstrong, English footballer and manager (b. 1944)
2004 – Mac Dre, American rapper and producer, founded Thizz Entertainment (b. 1970)
  2004   – Terry Knight, American singer-songwriter and producer (b. 1943)
2005 – Skitch Henderson, American pianist, composer, and conductor (b. 1918)
  2005   – Michael Piller, American screenwriter and producer (b. 1948)
2006 – Adrienne Shelly, American actress, director, and screenwriter (b. 1966)
  2006   – William Styron, American novelist and essayist (b. 1925)
2007 – S. Ali Raza, Indian director and screenwriter (b. 1922)
  2007   – Paul Tibbets, American general (b. 1915)
2008 – Jacques Piccard, Swiss oceanographer and engineer (b. 1922)
  2008   – Shakir Stewart, American record producer (b. 1974)
  2008   – Yma Sumac, Peruvian-American soprano and actress (b. 1922/1923)
2009 – Esther Hautzig, Lithuanian-American author (b. 1930)
  2009   – Endel Laas, Estonian scientist and academic (b. 1915)
  2009   – Robert H. Rines, American violinist and composer (b. 1922)
2010 – Shannon Tavarez, American actress (b. 1999)
  2010   – Diana Wellesley, Duchess of Wellington (b. 1922)
2011 – Cahit Aral, Turkish engineer and politician, Turkish Minister of Industry and Commerce (b. 1927)
2012 – Agustín García Calvo, Spanish poet, playwright, and philosopher (b. 1926)
  2012   – Mitch Lucker, American singer (b. 1984)
  2012   – Pascual Pérez, Dominican baseball player (b. 1957)
2013 – John Y. McCollister, American lieutenant and politician (b. 1921)
  2013   – Piet Rietveld, Dutch economist and academic (b. 1952)
2014 – Joel Barnett, Baron Barnett, English accountant and politician, Chief Secretary to the Treasury (b. 1923)
  2014   – Jackie Fairweather, Australian runner and coach (b. 1967)
  2014   – Abednigo Ngcobo, South African footballer (b. 1950)
  2014   – Jean-Pierre Roy, Canadian-American baseball player, manager, and sportscaster (b. 1920)
  2014   – Wayne Static, American singer-songwriter and guitarist (b. 1965)
2015 – Thomas R. Fitzgerald, American lawyer and judge (b. 1941)
  2015   – Houston McTear, American sprinter (b. 1957)
  2015   – Charles Duncan Michener, American entomologist and academic (b. 1918)
  2015   – Günter Schabowski, German journalist and politician (b. 1929)
  2015   – Fred Thompson, American actor, lawyer, and politician (b. 1942)
2020 – Keith Hitchins, American historian expert on Romanian history (b. 1931)
2021 – Hugo Dittfach, Canadian horse jockey (b. 1936)

2022 – Takeoff, member of the American hip-hop group Migos

Holidays and observances
All Saints' Day, a holy day of obligation in some areas (a national holiday in many historically Catholic countries), and its related observance:
Day of the Innocents, The first day of Day of the Dead or El Dia de los Muertos celebration. (Mexico, Haiti)
Anniversary of the Revolution (Algeria)
Chavang Kut (Mizo people of Northeast India, Bangladesh, Burma)
Chhattisgarh Rajyotsava (Chhattisgarh, India)
Christian feast day:
Austromoine
Benignus of Dijon
Caesarius of Africa
Santa Muerte (Folk Catholicism, Mexico and Southwestern United States)
November 1 (Eastern Orthodox liturgics)
Coronation of the fifth Druk Gyalpo (Bhutan)
Independence Day, celebrates the independence of Antigua and Barbuda from the United Kingdom in 1981.
Karnataka Rajyotsava (Karnataka, India)
Kerala Day (Kerala, India)
Liberty Day (United States Virgin Islands) 
International Lennox-Gastaut Syndrome Awareness Day
National Brush Day (United States) 
National Awakening Day (Bulgaria) 
Self-Defense Forces Commemoration Day (Japan) 
The first day of winter observances:
Calan Gaeaf, celebrations start at sunset of October 31. (Wales)
Samhain in the Northern Hemisphere and Beltane in the Southern Hemisphere, celebrations start at sunset of October 31 (Neopagan Wheel of the Year) 
World Vegan Day

References

External links

 
 
 

Days of the year
November